Lorainis Miguelina Cruz Moré (born 5 July 1992) is a Cuban retired footballer who played as a midfielder. She has been a member of the Cuba women's national team.

International career
Cruz capped for Cuba at senior level during the 2010 CONCACAF Women's World Cup Qualifying qualification and the 2012 CONCACAF Women's Olympic Qualifying Tournament qualification.

References

1992 births
Living people
Cuban women's footballers
Cuba women's international footballers
Women's association football midfielders